Yelizaveta Andrianovna Grechishnikova (born 12 December 1983) is a Russian long-distance runner. She represented Russia in the 5000 metres at the World Championships in Athletics in 2009 and 2011. She was eighth in the event at the 2010 European Athletics Championships.

Born in Mordovia, her first medal came at the 2007 Summer Universiade, where she was the 5000 m bronze medallist. Grechishnikova won her first national title at the Russian Indoor Championships in 2010. She took her first outdoor title two years later over 10,000 metres at the IAAF Moscow Challenge meeting.

On 25 October 2013 the Russian Anti-Doping Agency suspended her until 15 October 2015 and voided all her performances since 18 August 2009.

Achievements

References

1983 births
Living people
Russian female long-distance runners
Sportspeople from Ufa
Athletes (track and field) at the 2012 Summer Olympics
Olympic athletes of Russia
Doping cases in athletics
Russian sportspeople in doping cases
Universiade medalists in athletics (track and field)
Universiade bronze medalists for Russia
Medalists at the 2007 Summer Universiade